Buena Vista is a city in Marion County, Georgia, United States. It is part of the Columbus, Georgia-Alabama Metropolitan Statistical Area. The population was 1,585 at the 2020 census, down from 2,173 in 2010. Formerly known as "Pea Ridge", the city changed its name to Buena Vista in honor of Zachary Taylor's victory in the Mexican–American War. The city is the county seat of Marion County. It is the birthplace of baseball legend Josh Gibson and Medal of Honor recipient Luther H. Story.

History
Buena Vista was founded in 1830. In 1850, the seat of Marion County was transferred to Buena Vista from Tazewell. Buena Vista was incorporated as a town in 1850 and as a city in 1920.

Geography
Buena Vista is in central Marion County in western Georgia. Georgia State Routes 26 and 41 cross in the center of town. SR 26 leads west  to Cusseta and southeast  to Ellaville, while SR 41 leads north  to Geneva and south  to Preston. State Route 137 leads northeast  to Tazewell and west-northwest  to Union.

The city is part of the Flint River watershed. Sitting atop a ridge, it is drained by three separate stream systems. To the northeast is Oochee Creek, an east-flowing tributary of Buck Creek, which runs to the Flint River at Montezuma. The southeast part of the city drains to Muckalee Creek, which joins the Flint River at Albany. The west side of Buena Vista drains to Peacock Ditch, a tributary of Kinchafoonee Creek, which joins Muckalee Creek at Albany.

Demographics

2020 census

As of the 2020 United States census, there were 1,585 people, 722 households, and 478 families residing in the city.

2000 census
As of the census of 2000, there were 1,664 people, 645 households, and 377 families residing in the city. The racial makeup of the city was 63.40% African American, 25.84% White,  0.18% Native American, 0.36% Asian, 0.30% Pacific Islander, 8.59% from other races, and 1.32% from two or more races. Hispanic or Latino of any race were 17.91% of the population.

There were 645 households, out of which 32.2% had children under the age of 18 living with them, 25.4% were married couples living together, 26.5% had a female householder with no husband present, and 41.4% were non-families. 35.0% of all households were made up of individuals, and 16.1% had someone living alone who was 65 years of age or older.  The average household size was 2.55 and the average family size was 3.23.

In the city, the population was spread out, with 30.0% under the age of 18, 13.0% from 18 to 24, 27.3% from 25 to 44, 16.8% from 45 to 64, and 12.9% who were 65 years of age or older.  The median age was 30 years. For every 100 females, there were 101.2 males.  For every 100 females age 18 and over, there were 95.8 males.

The median income for a household in the city was $17,672, and the median income for a family was $21,738. Males had a median income of $19,306 versus $17,017 for females. The per capita income for the city was $11,406.  About 28.6% of families and 34.7% of the population were below the poverty line, including 43.3% of those under age 18 and 32.1% of those age 65 or over.

Education 
Marion County School District serves pre-school to grade twelve, and consists of one primary school (grades: pre-k through 5th) and a middle/high school (grades: 6th-12th). The district has 108 full-time teachers and over 1,686 students.
L. K. Moss Primary School
Marion County Middle High School—www.marion.k12.ga.us
The Marion County School District is in the process of opening a new middle/high school. The  structure will sit on 200 acres of land in the middle of the county and is scheduled to open for the 2012–13 school year.

Infrastructure
The city is served by Georgia State Route 26, Georgia State Route 41, and Georgia State Route 137.

Notable people
 Josh Gibson, Negro leagues baseball player and Hall of Famer
 Roosevelt Jackson, oldest living Negro leagues baseball player (minor leagues only)
 Eddie Owens Martin, creator of Pasaquan 
 Luther H. Story, Korean War Medal of Honor recipient

Gallery

References

Cities in Georgia (U.S. state)
Cities in Marion County, Georgia
County seats in Georgia (U.S. state)
Columbus metropolitan area, Georgia
Outsider art